Tramezzini NYC is a family-owned sandwich shop and Italian eatery in New York City that was the first to serve authentic Venetian sandwiches in the United States.

History
Tramezzini NYC was founded by and is currently managed by two Italian brothers, Filippo Paccagnella and Massimiliano Paccagnella, who thought of the idea in 2015. Prior to starting Tramezzini NYC, Filippo Paccagnella was an architect and designer. Both grew up in Pianiga, a small village in Veneto, Italy.

In 2016, Tramezzini NYC debuted as a vendor at Smorgasburg, a popular street food fair with multiple locations in New York and Brooklyn.
They became known for importing authentic bread and ingredients from Veneto, Italy.

Davide Pedon joined the owners as honorary co-founder in 2017 ,and they opened the first Tramezzini shop in USA
In May 2019, Tramezzini NYC was invited to the NYC Food Fair in Osaka where they introduced Venetian sandwiches for the first time in Japan.

Tramezzini NYC appeared on “Fork Yeah” by Thrillist in the episode “Meet the Tramezzino” in July 2019.and Wednesday, Feb. 3 2021 in the New York Times thanks to the idea of the “party box”.

Media reviews 

 In April 2017, Tramezzini NYC was featured on Gothamist’s “The Best Street Food Vendors in NYC.”
 Tramezzini NYC was featured on Thrillist’s “Best sandwiches around the world” in June 2019. 
 In April 2019, Tramezzini NYC made it onto a Bloomberg list called “The Best 14 Sandwiches in New York, as Picked by Top Chefs.”
 The Fung Brothers also featured Tramezzini NYC in a November 2020 episode of their YouTube show titled, “Is Subway's Italian better than an authentic Italian sandwich?”

See also
Tramezzino
Venetian cuisine

References

Restaurants in Manhattan
Restaurants in New York City
Restaurants established in 2015
2015 establishments in New York City
Cuisine of Veneto